The military ranks of Brunei are the military insignia used by the Royal Brunei Armed Forces. Given its history the rank insignia follow the former British influence with adaptations for Brunei conditions, the RBAF having started as an infantry regiment with air and naval assets.

Commissioned officer ranks
The rank insignia of commissioned officers.

Other ranks
The rank insignia of non-commissioned officers and enlisted personnel.

References

External links

Brunei